Sulzberger–Garbe syndrome  is a cutaneous condition, a type of therapy resistant nummular eczema.

See also 
 Id reaction
 List of cutaneous conditions

References

External links 

Eczema